The 2010–11 Nashville Predators season was the team's 13th season in the National Hockey League (NHL). They were defeated by the Vancouver Canucks in the second round of the Stanley Cup playoffs.

Pre-season 
With their 18th-overall first-round pick, the Predators chose Austin Watson of the Peterborough Petes.

Regular season
The Predators opened the season on October 9 at home against the Anaheim Ducks. The regular season ended on April 9, with their final game being against the St. Louis Blues.

Playoffs
The Predators clinched a berth in the 2011 Stanley Cup playoffs as the Western Conference's fifth seed. The Predators won their first playoff series in franchise history after defeating the Anaheim Ducks in six games to advance to the Western Conference Semifinals against the first seed, the Vancouver Canucks. In a low-scoring series, the Canucks managed to close out the Predators at Bridgestone Arena in six games.

Standings

Schedule and results

Pre-season

Regular season

Playoffs 

The Nashville Predators ended the 2010–11 regular season as the Western Conference's fifth seed. They defeated the fourth seed, the Anaheim Ducks, in the first round, 4–2, which is the first playoff series win in franchise history. Their opponent in the Western Conference Semifinals would be the Vancouver Canucks, who beat Nashville 4–2.

Player stats

Skaters
Note: GP = Games played; G = Goals; A = Assists; Pts = Points; +/− = Plus/minus; PIM = Penalty minutes

Goaltenders
Note: GP = Games played; TOI = Time on ice (minutes); W = Wins; L = Losses; OT = Overtime losses; GA = Goals against; GAA= Goals against average; SA= Shots against; SV= Saves; Sv% = Save percentage; SO= Shutouts

†Denotes player spent time with another team before joining Predators. Stats reflect time with the Predators only.
‡Traded mid-season
Bold/italics denotes franchise record

Awards and records

Awards

Milestones

Transactions 

The Predators have been involved in the following transactions during the 2010–11 season.

Trades

Notes

Free agents acquired

Free agents lost

Claimed via waivers

Lost via waivers

Player signings

Draft picks 

Nashville's picks at the 2010 NHL Entry Draft in Los Angeles, California.

See also 
 2010–11 NHL season

References

External links
2010–11 Nashville Predators season at ESPN
2010–11 Nashville Predators season at Hockey Reference

Nashville Predators seasons
N
N